The Temple of Edfu is an Egyptian temple located on the west bank of the Nile in Edfu, Upper Egypt. It is one of the best preserved shrines in Egypt. The temple was built in the Ptolemaic Kingdom between 237 and 57 BC. The inscriptions on its walls provide important information on language, myth and religion during the Hellenistic period in Egypt. In particular, the Temple's inscribed building texts "provide details [both] of its construction, and also preserve information about the mythical interpretation of this and all other temples as the Island of Creation." There are also "important scenes and inscriptions of the Sacred Drama which related the age-old conflict between Horus and Seth." They are translated by the Edfu-Project.

History

Edfu was one of several temples built during the Ptolemaic Kingdom, including the Dendera Temple complex, Esna, the Temple of Kom Ombo, and Philae. Its size reflects the relative prosperity of the time. The present temple, which was begun "on 23 August 237 BC, initially consisted of a pillared hall, two transverse halls, and a barque sanctuary surrounded by chapels." The building was started during the reign of Ptolemy III Euergetes and completed in 57 BC under Ptolemy XII Auletes. It was built on the site of an earlier, smaller temple also dedicated to Horus, although the previous structure was oriented east–west rather than north–south as in the present site. A ruined pylon lies just to the east of the current temple; inscriptional evidence has been found indicating a building program under the New Kingdom rulers Ramesses I, Seti I and Ramesses II. 

A naos of Nectanebo II, a relic from an earlier building, is preserved in the inner sanctuary, which stands alone while the temple's barque sanctuary is surrounded by nine chapels.

The temple of Edfu fell into disuse as a religious monument following Theodosius I's persecution of pagans and edict banning non-Christian worship within the Roman Empire in 391. As elsewhere, many of the temple's carved reliefs were razed by followers of the Christian faith which came to dominate Egypt. The blackened ceiling of the hypostyle hall, visible today, is believed to be the result of arson intended to destroy religious imagery that was then considered pagan.

Over the centuries, the temple became buried to a depth of 12 metres (39 ft) beneath drifting desert sand and layers of river silt deposited by the Nile. Local inhabitants built homes directly over the former temple grounds. Only the upper reaches of the temple pylons were visible by 1798, when the temple was identified by a French expedition. In 1860 Auguste Mariette, a French Egyptologist, began the work of freeing Edfu temple from the sands.

The Temple of Edfu is nearly intact and a very good example of an ancient Egyptian temple. Its archaeological significance and high state of preservation have made it a center for tourism in Egypt and a frequent stop for the many riverboats that cruise the Nile. In 2005, access to the temple was revamped with the addition of a visitor center and paved carpark.  A sophisticated lighting system was added in late 2006 to allow night visits.

Religious significance
The temple of Edfu is the largest temple dedicated to Horus and Hathor of Dendera. It was the center of several festivals sacred to Horus. Each year, "Hathor travelled south from her temple at Denderah to visit Horus at Edfu, and this event marking their sacred marriage was the occasion of a great festival and pilgrimage."

Influence on British architecture
The Temple of Edfu provides the model for Temple Works in Holbeck, Leeds. The courtyard columns at Edfu are closely copied in the frontage of the Works.

Gallery

See also
List of ancient Egyptian sites, including sites of temples
 Ancient Egyptian architecture
 Edfu South Pyramid

Notes

References

 Oakes, Lorna and Lucia Gahlin. Ancient Egypt: An illustrated reference to the myths, religions, pyramids and temples of the land of the pharaohs. 2006. 
 Kurth, Dieter.  The Temple of Edfu. 2004. American University in Cairo Press. 
 Émile Gaston Chassinat,  Maxence de Rochemonteix, Le temple d'Edfou, 14 vols. (1892–1934).

3rd-century BC religious buildings and structures
1798 archaeological discoveries
Archaeological sites in Egypt
Former religious buildings and structures in Egypt
Hellenistic architecture
Egyptian temples
Religious buildings and structures destroyed by arson
Tourist attractions in Egypt
Horus
3rd-century BC establishments in Egypt